Vinod Bharathi A (born 6 March 1983) is an Indian cinematographer who works in Tamil, Kannada and Malayalam films.

Cinematography

Film

Web series

Filmography

As Actor

References

External links

Tamil film cinematographers
Living people
Artists from Chennai
M.G.R. Government Film and Television Training Institute alumni
1983 births
Kannada film cinematographers
Malayalam film cinematographers
21st-century Indian photographers
Cinematographers from Tamil Nadu